It Is the Business of the Future to Be Dangerous is the eighteenth studio album by the English space rock group Hawkwind, released in 1993. It spent one week on the UK albums chart at #75.

As with the previous album, Electric Tepee, the group remained a three-piece of guitarist Dave Brock, bassist Alan Davey and drummer Richard Chadwick. The album was recorded in 1993 at Brock's own Barking Dog Studios, produced with Paul Cobbold.

The title track "It Is the Business of the Future to Be Dangerous" is a quote from the mathematician/philosopher Alfred Whitehead's Science and the Modern World, which had originally been used on the sleeve notes to the Space Ritual album ("It is the business of the future to be dangerous; and it is among the merits of science that it equips the future for its duties"). The Arabic-influenced "Space Is Their (Palestine)" would be worked into the middle section of the live version of "Hassan I Sabbah", retitled "Assassins of Allah". "Letting in the Past" is a re-recording of "Looking in the Future" from the 1982 album Church of Hawkwind. "The Camera That Could Lie" is a reggae-influenced piece that fused music which had previously been used in the middle section of the live version of "Damnation Alley" on the 1992 album Palace Springs with lyrics from the song "Living on a Knife Edge" from the 1981 album Sonic Attack. "Gimme Shelter" is a cover version of the Rolling Stones song that the group had recorded with Samantha Fox for the Shelter benefit single "Putting Our House in Order", although this album version removes Fox's vocal. Drummer Richard Chadwick performs vocals instead.

The group undertook a 21-date UK tour in November to promote the album. This was followed by a 12 date Germany/Netherlands tour in December. Some shows were recorded and were released as The Business Trip and the mistitled Treworgey 1989 CD.

Track listing
"It Is the Business of the Future to Be Dangerous" (Dave Brock, Richard Chadwick, Alan Davey) – 6:23
"Space Is Their (Palestine)" (Brock) – 11:46
"Tibet Is Not China (Part 1)" (Davey) – 3:39
"Tibet Is Not China (Part 2)" (Brock, Chadwick, Davey) – 3:20
"Let Barking Dogs Lie" (Brock, Chadwick, Davey) – 9:01
"Wave upon Wave" (Davey) – 3:13
"Letting in the Past" [aka "Looking in the Future"] (Brock) – 2:53
"The Camera That Could Lie" (Brock) – 4:56
"3 or 4 Erections in the Course of a Night" (Brock, Davey) – 2:02
"Techno Tropic Zone Exists" (Brock) – 4:30
"Gimme Shelter" (Mick Jagger, Keith Richards) – 5:34
"Avante" (Brock, Chadwick, Davey) – 6:00

Atomhenge CD bonus tracks
"Gimme Shelter" [Single version with Samantha Fox] (Jagger, Richards) - 5:56

Atomhenge bonus CD
"Spirit of the Age" [Radio Edit] (Dave Brock, Robert Calvert) - 4:08
"Spirit of the Age" [Full Vocal Mix] (Brock, Calvert) – 9:52
"Spirit of the Age" [Cyber Trance MIx] (Brock, Calvert) – 9:53
"Spirit of the Age" [Flesh to Phantasy Ambient Mix] (Brock, Calvert) – 12:08
"Right to Decide" [Original MIx] (Dave Brock, Alan Davey) – 4:24
"The Camera That Would Not Die" [Original Mix] (Brock) – 5:17
"Right to Decide" [Alien Prophets Radio Edit Mix] (Brock, Davey) – 4:09
"Assassin" [Magick Carpet by Swordfish / Astralasia] (Calvert) – 10:21

"The Solstice Remixes" EP: tracks 1-4
The "Right to Decide" EP: tracks 5-8

Personnel
Hawkwind
Dave Brock – guitars, keyboards, programming, sequencing, sampling, vocals
Alan Davey – bass guitar, vocals, keyboards, programming, sequencing, sampling
Richard Chadwick – drums, vocals

Credits
Recorded at Barking Dog Studios, Devon
Engineered by Paul Cobbold
Produced by Hawkwind
Artwork by Alan The Ghost

"The Solstice Remixes" EP
Remixes by Astralasia
Produced by Salt Tank
The "Decide Your Future" EP
Compiled and Arranged by Salt Tank

Release history
October 1993: Essential Records, ESDLP196, UK Double LP
October 1993: Essential Records, ESSCD196, UK CD
October 1993: Essential Records, ESSMC196, UK Cassette
June 1994: Griffin Music, GCDHA 161-1, USA
July 1999: Essential Records, ESMCD 740, UK CD digipak
January 2012: Atomhenge (Cherry Red) Records, ATOMCD21032, UK CD

References

1993 albums
Hawkwind albums